Daniela Paz Zamora Mancilla (born 13 November 1990) is a Chilean footballer who plays as a forward for Universidad de Chile and the Chile women's national team.

International goals

References

External links 
 

1990 births
Living people
Chilean women's footballers
Women's association football forwards
Djurgårdens IF Fotboll (women) players
Chile women's international footballers
2019 FIFA Women's World Cup players
Chilean expatriate women's footballers
Chilean expatriate sportspeople in Sweden
Expatriate women's footballers in Sweden
Footballers at the 2020 Summer Olympics
Olympic footballers of Chile